Christine Huyen Tran Ha (born May 9, 1979) is an American chef, writer and TV host. She is the first blind contestant of MasterChef and the winner of its third season in 2012.

Early and personal life
Hà was born as an only child in Los Angeles County, California. Her parents were of Vietnamese origin; they immigrated from Saigon (present day Ho Chi Minh City) to the United States in 1975 after the Vietnam War. She lived in Lakewood, California and Long Beach, California as a young child before her family moved to Houston, Texas. When Hà was 14, her mother died from lung cancer.

Hà graduated with a bachelor's degree in business administration and finance along with MIS from the University of Texas at Austin. She also earned a master's of fine arts in creative fiction and nonfiction from the University of Houston's nationally acclaimed writing program.

Hà has Neuromyelitis optica,  in which a person's own immune system attacks the optic nerves and spinal cord. In 2004, she was diagnosed and gradually started losing her vision, and was almost completely blind by 2007. She describes her vision as "looking at a very foggy mirror after a hot shower". She uses adaptive technologies to help her manage her social media profiles by herself. Há utilizes the following assistive technologies around her house: VoiceOver, JAWS, Aira glasses, Amigo portable CCTV along with a thermometer, food scale and liquid level indicator that gives an oral reading.

Hà serves as fiction editor for Gulf Coast: A Journal of Literature and Fine Arts, and her work has appeared in Fire Point, The ScissorTale Review and PANK Magazine, among others. In January 2014, she began hosting the cooking show Four Senses on AMI-TV.

Career

2012: MasterChef USA & Recipes from My Home Kitchen: Asian and American Comfort Food

While she has never studied cooking, in the nineteen episodes where she competed on the third season of MasterChef, Hà won seven times in both individual and team challenges; additionally, she placed three times in the top three group. However, she was also in the bottom group twice. On September 10, 2012, Hà was announced the winner of the competition and was awarded $250,000, the MasterChef title, the MasterChef trophy, and a cookbook deal.

Her cookbook, Recipes from My Home Kitchen: Asian and American Comfort Food, was released on May 14, 2013.

2013–present: Four Senses, Masterchef Vietnam and guest appearances
In 2013, Ha began co-hosting the Canadian TV show Four Senses with Carl Heinrich, the winner of Season 2 of Top Chef Canada.  It is a cooking show geared towards the visually impaired, and airs on AMI (Accessible Media, Inc.) TV, a Canadian cable network designed to make television accessible to the vision and hearing impaired. To compensate for the vision-impaired, the show contains a great deal of audio description, where they are narrating what's going on in the kitchen, what they're doing, how things feel or smell or sound.

In 2015, she revealed on her blog and Facebook page that she would become a judge on the third season of MasterChef Vietnam, having been a guest judge in the previous series, and a guest judge of US MasterChef (season 4), making her the first former contestant and winner worldwide to become a regular judge, and also one of a few female judges after Phan Tôn Tịnh Hải (also Masterchef Vietnam), Michal Ansky of Israel and Christina Tosi.   In the meantime, she also returned along with Luca Manfé and Courtney Lapresi as guests of US MasterChef (season 6). Later in the year, she also made an appearance in MasterChef Celebrity Showdown in the battle of "Champions vs Juniors", where she, alongside Season 4 winner Luca Manfe and Season 6 winner Claudia Sandoval, cooked against 3 contestants from MasterChef Junior season 4 in a Salmon Wellington tag team battle. The three champions emerged as the winner and donate their winnings to their chosen charity.

She also revealed that she was the first chef/author to become the winner of Helen Keller Personal Achievement Award in 2014, an award given to people and organizations that "demonstrated outstanding achievement in improving quality of life for people with vision loss".  Past/current winners included musicians Stevie Wonder, Ray Charles and Tom Sullivan, actor Charlie Cox (who portrayed a blind superhero, Matt Murdock/Daredevil, was awarded in June 2015) and businessman Bernard A. Newcomb.

She has also opened small-scale pop-up restaurants around the world in the 5 years since winning Master Chef (2012–2017).

She has traveled around the world to give TED talks about her life experiences as a blind cook and the lessons she has learned along the way . "Christine has also served as a culinary envoy on behalf of the American Embassy in cultural diplomacy programs in Jordan, Serbia, Bosnia and Herzegovina, and Croatia".

In 2018, Hà opened a Vietnamese gastropub in Bravery Chef Hall in Houston, Texas named "The Blind Goat". The name is a combination of her disability and her Vietnamese zodiac sign. The Blind Goat received three stars from the Houston Chronicle and was named a semi-finalist for Best New Restaurant in America by the James Beard Foundation in 2020. In the same Bravery Chef Hall, she and her husband John Suh opened a Korean restaurant called "The Sighted Pig Test Kitchen", which is a combination of her husbands zodiac sign. The menu is centered around authentic Vietnamese dishes, specifically drawing inspiration from Nhau cuisine. Beginning June 2018, Ha began working on her memoir and second cookbook.

At the start of 2020, Ha teamed up with Saigon House chef and owner, Tony Nguyen, to open Xin Chao restaurant in Houston. The menu showcases their  Vietnamese-American heritage and culinary skills with a contemporary approach to traditional Vietnamese dishes with a touch of Texas BBQ and Gulf Coast seafood.

References

External links
 The Blind Cook (blog from Christine Hà)
 Gulfcoast
 Christine Hà on Facebook
 Christine Hà on Twitter
Christine Ha on YouTube
 Rene Lynch, 'MasterChef' finalist Christine Ha on being blind, and a fighter, LA Times, September 5, 2012
 Video Inspiring MasterChef USA Audition (Season 3 Episode 1) - Christine Ha: Blind Chef ,  on June 11, 2012
 Video MasterChef US - Season 3 Episode 20 - Final Winner !, on September 10, 2012
 Video Christine Ha at Entertainment Tonight

People from Houston
Living people
1979 births
Participants in American reality television series
Reality cooking competition winners
MasterChef (American TV series)
American blind people
American television chefs
American people of Vietnamese descent
McCombs School of Business alumni
Writers of blogs about home and family
American cookbook writers
People from Lakewood, California
University of Houston alumni
Women cookbook writers
American women bloggers
American bloggers
American women chefs
Asian American chefs
American women non-fiction writers
21st-century American women writers
University of Texas at Austin School of Information alumni